James Henry Cecil Collins MBE (23 March 1908 – 4 June 1989) was an English painter and printmaker, originally associated with the Surrealist movement.

Life and works
Collins was born in Plymouth and worked first as a mechanic at a firm based in Devonport. From 1924 to 1927 he attended Plymouth School of Art. In 1927 he won a scholarship to the Royal College of Art where he won the William Rothenstein Life Drawing Prize.

From 1951 to 1975 he taught at the Central School of Art. Later, one of his pupils was Ginger Gilmour.

Collins was awarded an MBE in June 1979.

BBC Radio ran a programme about him in 1981 in the Conversations with Artists series, with Edward Lucie-Smith. In 1984 BBC TV showed a 30-minute documentary devoted to Collins, 'Fools and Angels', in the 'One Pair of Eyes' series.

A retrospective exhibition of his prints was held at the Tate Gallery in 1981. A retrospective of his paintings took place (before Collins died) in 1989. He was buried on the western side of Highgate Cemetery.

His widow Elisabeth Collins died in 2000 and, in 2008, 250 of Collins' paintings worth £1 million were given to museums and galleries in the UK.

In honour of the centenary of his birth, an exhibition of Collins' work took place at Tate Britain in Autumn 2008.

Exhibitions

 1935 - Bloomsbury Gallery, London, England
 1936 - International Surrealist Exhibition - New Burlington Galleries, London, England
 1942 - Toledo Museum of Fine Art, US
 1948 - New Paintings by Cecil Collins - Lefevre Gallery, London, England
 1950 - New Paintings - Heffer Gallery, Cambridge, England
 1951 - Leicester Galleries
 1953 - Society of Mural Painters
 1953 - Ashmolean Museum, Oxford
 1954 - Arts Council, London
 1956 - Leicester Galleries
 1959 - Whitechapel Gallery, London
 1961 - Gallery Zygos, Athens, Greece
 1964 - Carnegie International Exhibition, Pittsburgh, US
 1965 - Arthur Tooth & Sons
 1967 - Crane Kalman Gallery
 1971 - Britain's Contribution to Surrealism - Hamet Gallery, London, England
 1972 - Retrospective Exhibition. Drawings, Paintings, Watercolours, Gouaches and Paintings 1936-1968
 1981 - New Works - Anthony d'Offay, London, England
 1981 - The Prints of Cecil Collins - Tate Gallery, London, England
 1983 - Plymouth Arts Centre
 1984 - Festival Gallery, Aldeburgh
 1988 - Recent Paintings - Anthony d'Offay, London, England
 1989 - Tate Gallery, London

Bibliography

 The Gates of Silence (Grey Walls Press, 1944) by Wrey Gardiner with drawings by Cecil Collins
 The Vision of the Fool (Grey Walls Press, 1947)
 Cecil Collins: Painter of Paradise (1979) by Kathleen Raine
 The Quest for the Great Happiness (1988) by William Anderson
 In Celebration of Cecil Collins: Visionary Artist and Educator (2008) compiled and edited by Nomi Rowe
 The Magic Mirror: Thoughts and Reflections on Cecil Collins (2010) by John Stewart Allitt
 Meditations, Poems, Pages from a Sketch Book, by Cecil Collins (Golgonooza Press, 1997)
 The Vision of the Fool and other Writings, by Cecil Collins, enlarged edition (Golgonooza Press, 2002)
 Cecil Collins, The Artist as Writer and Image Maker, by Brian Keeble (Golgonooza Press, 2009)

References

External links
 
 Cecil Collins at the Tate Gallery
 Eye of the Heart. The paintings of Cecil Collins. 1978. Arts Council England film collection

1908 births
1989 deaths
Burials at Highgate Cemetery
20th-century English painters
English male painters
Alumni of the Royal College of Art
Artists from Plymouth, Devon
English printmakers
20th-century British printmakers
Royal Academicians
20th-century English male artists